The paper disc is a digital disc format.  Developed by Sony and Toppan Printing, the disc can be read by Sony's new Blu-ray Disc (BD) player and offers up to 25 GB of storage. It was  announced on April 15, 2004.

The basic structure of Sony's paper disc is similar to that of a Blu-ray Disc in that the recording layer on which the data is stored lies under a 0.1 millimeter protective layer and on top of a 1.1 millimeter substrate. In a Blu-ray Disc, this substrate is made of polycarbonate plastic, which is replaced with paper in a paper disc. This results in a disc containing approximately 51% paper by weight.

References

External links
 Press release
 

Rotating disc computer storage media